Piotr Kolc (born 15 July 1987) is a Polish retired football midfielder. He is currently the manager of the III liga side Zawisza Bydgoszcz.

Playing career
He began his career at Polonia Gdańsk on 2006, he then moved on a free transfer to Cartusia Kartuzy on 1 July 2006. In 2008 he moved to Pogoń Szczecin on another free transfer, but after suffering a serious injury, Kolc was unable to find a starting place in the team and was released on 10 November 2009.
On 1 February 2010 he moved to Jeziorak Ilawa, but he left the club in July with his contract expiring.
On 1 January 2011 Kolc joined Gryf Wejherowo. He stayed at Gryf for eight years before leaving to Sokół Ostróda in 2019 on a free transfer. He retired in 2020 after playing one season for Sokół.

Coaching career
After signing for Sokól in 2019 he held the position of player/manager.

On 3 August 2020 he was appointed as Krzysztof Brede's assistant manager at Podbeskidzie Bielsko-Biala. He left Podbeskidzie on 23 December a week after Brede was sacked.

On 19 January 2021 he became the manager of Zawisza Bydgoszcz. In his first season in charge Kolc got Zawisza promoted to the III liga winning the 2020-21 IV liga Cuyavia-Pomerania group. On 15 June 2022 under Kolc's management, Zawisza won the Kujawsko-Pomorskie Polish regional cup.

Honours

Manager
Sokół Ostróda
III liga, group I: 2019–20

Zawisza Bydgoszcz
IV liga Cuyavia-Pomerania group: 2020–21
Polish Cup Cuyavia-Pomerania: 2021–22

References

External links
 

Living people
1987 births
Polish footballers
Association football midfielders
Polonia Gdańsk players
Cartusia Kartuzy players
Pogoń Szczecin players
Jeziorak Iława players
Gryf Wejherowo players
Sokół Ostróda players
II liga players
Polish football managers
Sportspeople from Gdańsk
Zawisza Bydgoszcz managers